Muppets from Space is a 1999 American science-fiction comedy film directed by Tim Hill (in his feature film directorial debut) and written by Jerry Juhl, Joseph Mazzarino, and Ken Kaufman. The sixth theatrical film in The Muppets franchise, it is the only Muppets film to not be a musical and the first film since the death of Muppets creator Jim Henson to have an original Muppets-focused plot. In addition to the Muppet performers, the film stars Jeffrey Tambor, F. Murray Abraham, David Arquette, Josh Charles, Hollywood Hogan, Ray Liotta, and Andie MacDowell. In the film, Gonzo attempts to discover his origins. After he and Rizzo the Rat are captured by government officials during his search, Kermit the Frog and the rest of the Muppet gang set out to rescue them.

The film was shot in Wilmington, North Carolina in 1998, and was released in the United States on July 14, 1999 by Sony Pictures Releasing under its Columbia Pictures label. It grossed $22.3 million and had a budget of $24 million. Alongside The Adventures of Elmo in Grouchland, it is the last Muppets feature film to have the involvement of Frank Oz prior to his retirement from Muppet performing the following year. It is also the last Muppet film written by Juhl prior to his death in 2005, the last Muppets film to be released theatrically until The Muppets in 2011, and the last theatrically released Muppet film to be produced by The Jim Henson Company before the franchise was acquired by The Walt Disney Company in 2004.

Plot
Gonzo's species has always been a mystery; but after having dreams of being denied entry to Noah's Ark, he begins to realize just how alone he is in the world.

Gonzo tells Kermit that he is getting tired of being referred to as a "whatever". After an alien species appears to be trying to send a message through his bowl of cereal, Gonzo realizes that he may not be alone after all and that evening, he climbs to the rooftop of the Muppet boarding house to watch the sky. Suddenly, he is struck by a bolt of lightning, which allows him to communicate with a pair of cosmic knowledge fish, who reveal his origins as an alien from outer space.

Hoping to contact the aliens, Gonzo makes an impromptu appearance at the television studio for UFO Mania, where Miss Piggy works. Unable to convince Kermit and his friends of the aliens' existence, Gonzo is lured by Agent Barker to K. Edgar Singer of C.O.V.N.E.T., a top secret national security facility disguised as a cement factory, whose mission is to investigate threats of extraterrestrial attacks. Singer is aware of the aliens' attempts to communicate with Earth, and having seen Gonzo on television, believes that he is the key to convincing his superior General Luft that aliens exist.

Gonzo and Rizzo are taken to C.O.V.N.E.T., where Hulk Hogan, who is working there as an agent, flushes Rizzo down a tube to the facility's rat medical research held by Dr. Tucker, alongside other Muppet rats. Unable to get answers from Gonzo about the aliens, Singer decides to have Gonzo's brain surgically removed, and has him taken to a holding cell. Meanwhile, after Miss Piggy interrogates Barker, she, Kermit, Fozzie, Pepe, and Animal go to rescue Gonzo and Rizzo from C.O.V.N.E.T., using various inventions from Bunsen and Beaker.

While Gonzo is in his cell, an alien channeling his voice through a sandwich asks him where the alien ship can land, and Gonzo suggests a beach known by the name of Cape Doom, unaware that Singer's assistant Agent Rentro (Bobo the Bear) is listening. Gonzo is then taken to the surgery room, and the Muppets arrive to rescue Gonzo and Rizzo.

Meanwhile, Rizzo escapes from medical research and frees Gonzo from the dissection table, while Singer and Luft witness the other rats attack the surgeon Dr. Phil Van Neuter. Luft feels that his time has been wasted and angrily leaves. Upon discovering from Rentro that Gonzo is heading for Cape Doom, Singer prepares the Subatomic Neutro-Destabilizer weapon to use on the aliens. Singer and Rentro then head to Cape Doom.

The Muppets rescue Gonzo from the facility, then arrive at Cape Doom where a crowd of alien believers await their arrival. After an hour-long wait, the ship comes to Earth and the aliens, who all resemble Gonzo, explain that many years ago they lost him, but now welcome him back. Singer shows up and tries to kill the aliens, ultimately failing to do so (Rentro having removed the weapon's battery) and is laughed at. Gonzo considers going with his long-lost family to their home planet, but chooses to stay on Earth with the Muppets with his family's blessing. Singer is invited by the aliens to go with them and leaves as Earth's ambassador.

Later that night, Gonzo and the other Muppets watch the stars from the boarding house roof.

Cast
 Jeffrey Tambor as K. Edgar "Ed" Singer, the head of C.O.V.N.E.T.
 Pat Hingle as General Luft, a military official who K. Edgar Singer reports to
 Rob Schneider as the TV producer of UFO Mania
 Andie MacDowell as Shelley Snipes, a UFO Mania anchorwoman
 Gary Owens as UFO Mania Announcer (voice)

Muppets performers
 Dave Goelz as Gonzo, Bunsen Honeydew, Waldorf, The Birdman, Zoot and Beauregard
 Steve Whitmire as Kermit the Frog, Rizzo the Rat, Beaker, Cosmic Fish #1, Bean Bunny and Alien Gonzo
 Bill Barretta as Pepe the Prawn, Bobo as Rentro, Bubba the Rat, Johnny Fiama, Cosmic Fish #2, Rowlf the Dog and The Swedish Chef
 Jerry Nelson as Robin, Statler, Ubergonzo, Floyd Pepper and Lew Zealand
 Brian Henson as Dr. Phil Van Neuter, Sal Minella and Talking Sandwich
 Kevin Clash as Clifford and Carter
 Frank Oz as Miss Piggy, Fozzie Bear, Animal and Sam Eagle
 Drew Massey as Fast Eddie
 Peter Linz as Shakes
 John Kennedy as Dr. Teeth
 Adam Hunt as Scooter
 John Henson as Sweetums

Additionally, Whitmire, Kennedy, Linz, Massey, and Rickey Boyd make on-screen cameos as hippies at Cape Doom.

Cameos
 F. Murray Abraham as Noah, he appears in Gonzo's nightmare.
 David Arquette as Dr. Tucker, a sadistic scientist that works at C.O.V.N.E.T. and is in charge of the medical research that involves the rats
 Josh Charles as Agent Barker, an operative of C.O.V.N.E.T. who is interrogated by Miss Piggy.
 Kathy Griffin as an armed guard of C.O.V.N.E.T. who falls in love with Animal.
 Hulk Hogan as himself, working as an operative of C.O.V.N.E.T. who throws Rizzo into the lab.
 Ray Liotta as the gate guard at C.O.V.N.E.T. whom Miss Piggy manipulates with the spray bottle created by Bunsen and Beaker.
 Katie Holmes as Joey Potter, a character from Dawson's Creek (uncredited)
 Joshua Jackson as Pacey Witter, a character from Dawson's Creek (uncredited)

Production
As with Muppet Treasure Island (1996), veteran Muppet performer Frank Oz was unavailable for most of the shooting of Muppets from Space due to scheduling conflicts with his directing career. As a result, his characters were performed on set by other Muppet performers, with Oz later looping his voice in post-production. For most of the filming, Peter Linz, John Kennedy, and Rickey Boyd performed his characters, with Linz performing Miss Piggy, Boyd performing Animal and Kennedy performing Sam Eagle and Fozzie Bear. Kennedy and Linz's voices can be heard in the film's theatrical trailer.

Filming began in November 1998 at Screen Gem Studios in Wilmington, North Carolina.

The film would mark the first appearance of Scooter since the theme park attraction Muppet*Vision 3D (1991). His voice was performed in Muppets from Space by Adam Hunt, the brother of Scooter's initial performer Richard Hunt.

The film's visual effects were provided by Illusion Arts.

Writing
An earlier draft of the story was written by Kirk Thatcher called Muppets in Space. In the screenplay, aliens abducted Kermit because they believed him to be their leader, leading the other Muppets to attempt to save him. A set of Welch's Jelly Glasses were produced based around this theme. According to the production notes featured on the DVD, the film was inspired by Gonzo's song in The Muppet Movie (1979), "I'm Going to Go Back There Someday".

In a 2009 interview, co-writer Joseph Mazzarino revealed that he left the project before shooting started, due to changes made to his draft of the screenplay. Mazzarino stated that his draft included parodies of Men in Black, Contact (both 1997) and Alien (1979), and that Randal Kleiser had been selected to direct the film. However, shortly before shooting began, The Jim Henson Company fired Kleiser, as they felt he was not "bringing enough vision", with Mazzarino subsequently hiring Timothy Hill as the new director, and the parodies were removed, as Hill wanted the film to be "more real".

In addition, Mazzarino disliked the revised ending of the film, and stated in his draft Gonzo did not turn out to be an alien. Instead, the aliens were getting signals from episodes of The Muppet Show and made themselves look like Gonzo, as they considered him to be the "ultimate being". In the end, they would reveal their true forms, and Gonzo would remain a "whatever", with his family being the Muppets.

Music

Muppets from Space was the first Muppet film to not feature original music, opting instead for a soundtrack consisting primarily of classic soul and funk tracks.

Some tracks were remade by contemporary artists, such as "Shining Star" by the Dust Brothers featuring Jeymes, and "Dazz" by G. Love and Special Sauce, recorded at Muscle Shoals Sound Studio in Sheffield, Alabama. The band was in the studio recording with Little Milton on the "Welcome To Little Milton" record. The band got a call from Jason Brown, their manager, while in the studio, to record a song for the movie. Will McFarlane, who was a Shoals/Malaco studio regular, and former Bonnie Raitt guitarist, played with the band on the song. Parliament's "Flash Light" was updated by George Clinton as a duet with Pepe the King Prawn named "Flash Light (Spaceflight)".

Two soundtracks were released featuring music from the film. The first album, Muppets from Space: The Ultimate Muppet Trip, consisted of the classic soul and funk tracks featured in the film and was jointly released by Sony Wonder, Epic Records, and Sony Music Soundtrax a day before the film's premiere, while the other was an album containing the film's score, which was composed by Jamshied Sharifi with additional work by Rupert Gregson-Williams. This album was released by Varèse Sarabande on August 13, 1999.

Earlier drafts of the film contained original music, including the song "Eye 2 the Sky", written and recorded by Ween, which was not included on the soundtrack. This song was intended to be sung by Gonzo. Gonzo's performer Dave Goelz had also recorded a new rendition of "I'm Going to Go Back There Someday" for this film, a song which had originally appeared in The Muppet Movie (1979). This song was also dropped, but was included on the Muppets from Space soundtrack, also sung by Gonzo.

Release

Marketing
To promote the film's theatrical release, Muppets from Space was accompanied with a marketing campaign with promotional tie-ins such as Wendy's and Travelodge. From May 17 to May 21, 1999, Wheel of Fortune had a theme called "Wheel Goes to the Movies" which featured a prize on the Wheel that included a four day trip to Los Angeles for the world premiere of Muppets from Space. For the film's home video release, the pizza restaurant chain Sbarro promoted the film with six figurines in a set, along with Muppet pizza boxes and bags.

Home media
On October 26, 1999, the film was released on VHS and DVD with supplemental features such as a blooper reel and an audio commentary by Kermit the Frog, Gonzo, Rizzo, and director Tim Hill. It was released alongside The Muppets Take Manhattan on a double feature DVD by Sony Pictures Home Entertainment on June 9, 2008. The film received a Blu-ray release on August 16, 2011 also alongside The Muppets Take Manhattan, with all of the special features from the DVD included.

Reception

Box office
Muppets from Space was released on July 16, 1999 in 2,265 theaters and grossed $7 million during its five-day opening frame. At the end of its theatrical run, the film grossed $22.3 million worldwide against its $24 million budget.

Critical response
On Rotten Tomatoes, the film has an approval rating of 63% based on 57 reviews and an average score of 6.17/10. The site's consensus reads: "If Muppets from Space lacks the magic and wit of its cinematic predecessors, this pleasingly silly space romp is funny and clever enough to make for better-than-average family entertainment."

Roger Ebert of the Chicago Sun-Times gave the film a two-star rating (out of four) and concluded his review by saying that "maybe Muppets from Space is just not very good, and they'll make a comeback. I hope so. Because I just don't seem to care much anymore." Conversely, Robin Rauzi of the Los Angeles Times gave the film a positive review, stating that "twenty years after The Muppet Movie and 30 after the beginning of Sesame Street, there is still life in these creations of felt, foam rubber and fake fur. With care, they will easily entertain and educate a third or fourth generation of children. The magic is back."

Michael Wilmington, reviewing for The Chicago Tribune, praised the puppeteers' performances, but remarked "[t]his picture isn't goofy or dreamy enough, however engaging it may be to re-encounter the intrigues of Miss Piggy, the wistfulness of Kermit or the weirdness of Gonzo. Or relax into the period funk soundtrack (including the O'Jays' "Survival," Earth, Wind and Fire's "Shining Star" and many others)." Lawrence Van Gelder of The New York Times felt the "Frenetic movement and loud music overwhelm warmth and compassion, and the balance of character, plot, irreverent humor and innate decency that made some of the earlier Muppet movies so welcome is lost."

In a 2000 interview, Frank Oz described the film as not "up to what it should have been" and "not the movie that we wanted it to be."

References

External links

 
 
 
 
 
 

1999 films
1990s English-language films
1990s adventure comedy films
1990s fantasy adventure films
1990s science fiction comedy films
American adventure comedy films
American science fiction comedy films
American fantasy comedy films
American fantasy adventure films
Puppet films
Films about extraterrestrial life
Films directed by Tim Hill
Films scored by Jamshied Sharifi
Films shot in North Carolina
Films with screenplays by Jerry Juhl
The Muppets films
Columbia Pictures films
The Jim Henson Company films
1999 directorial debut films
1999 comedy films
1990s American films